White Knight is the 25th solo studio album by American singer-songwriter Todd Rundgren. The album was released on May 12, 2017, by Cleopatra Records.

Critical reception

White Knight received generally mixed reviews from critics. At Metacritic, which assigns a normalized rating out of 100 to reviews from mainstream publications, the album received an average score of 60, based on 6 reviews.

Track listing
All tracks are written by Todd Rundgren and the featured artists.

References

2017 albums
Todd Rundgren albums